This is a listing of the horses that finished in either first, second, or third place and the number of starters in the Breeders' Cup Turf, a grade one race run on grass held on Saturday of the Breeders' Cup World Thoroughbred Championships.

† Deadheat for first place

See also 

 Breeders' Cup World Thoroughbred Championships

References 

Turf
Lists of horse racing results